is a Japanese footballer who plays for Fukushima United FC.

Club statistics
Updated to 23 February 2016.

References

External links

Profile at Fukushima United FC

1986 births
Living people
Association football people from Kanagawa Prefecture
Japanese footballers
J1 League players
J2 League players
J3 League players
Japan Football League players
Nagoya Grampus players
Avispa Fukuoka players
Montedio Yamagata players
Fukushima United FC players
Association football goalkeepers